No Wising Up No Settling Down is a solo studio album by American hip hop artist Sole. It was released on May 1, 2013. It includes contributions from Gold Panda, The Hood Internet, Dosh, Ceschi, Man Mantis, Skyrider, Cars & Trains, and Loden. Music videos were created for "I Think I'm Emma Goldman" and "Extremophile".

Production
Meant to be a sequel to A Ruthless Criticism of Everything Existing, No Wising Up No Settling Down is the second installment in the Ruthless Criticism of Everything Existing series. It "focuses more on the personal and social/philosophical aspects of the class struggle", abandoning the "overtly political song writing for a more subtle, honest, experimental and poetic approach."

Track listing

References

External links
 

2013 albums
Sole (hip hop artist) albums